The Madonna Colonna is an oil on poplar painting by the Italian Renaissance artist Raphael. It was painted c. 1507–1508, near the end of Raphael's Florentine period.

This painting should not be confused with the Colonna Altarpiece by the same artist which is at the Metropolitan Museum of Art in New York.

See also
List of paintings by Raphael

Notes

References

External links

1508 paintings
Paintings of the Madonna and Child by Raphael
Paintings in the Gemäldegalerie, Berlin
Nude art